Santa Ana is a town and parish in Cuenca Canton, Azuay Province, Ecuador. The parish covers an area of 45.4 km² and according to the 2001 Ecuadorian census it had a population total of 4,739.

References

Populated places in Azuay Province
Parishes of Ecuador